The 1982 United States Senate election in Florida was held on November 2, 1982. Incumbent Democratic U.S. Senator Lawton Chiles won re-election to a third term.

Democratic primary

Candidates 
Lawton Chiles, incumbent U.S. Senator

Results

Republican primary

Candidates 
David H. Bludworth, Palm Beach County State Attorney since 1973
Van B. Poole, State Senator from Fort Lauderdale
George Snyder, former Democratic Maryland State Senator

Results

General election

Candidates 
Lawton Chiles (D), incumbent U.S. Senator
Van B. Poole (R), State Senator

Results

See also 
 1982 United States Senate elections

References 

Florida
1982
1982 Florida elections